The Divine Word College of Legazpi also referred to by its acronym DWCL is a private Catholic coeducational basic and higher education institution run by the Philippine Central Province of the Society of the Divine Word in Legazpi, Albay, Philippines. It was founded by Rev. Fr. Juan Carullo, a retired Army Chaplain in 1947.

History
The Divine Word College of Legazpi (DWCL) sprang into existence from a small school named Liceo de Albay (LDA), a diocesan school for boys. In 1947 the LDA was entrusted to Fr. Juan Carullo, a retired army chaplain. The school had a  Board of Trustees. The school building was located at Corners Rizal St. and Maria Clara St. (now Fr. Joseph L. Bates St.),Legazpi City. The lot was donated by the Calleja family of Legazpi City.

In 1952, the LDA was ravaged by Typhoon Trix. Financial limitation became a major problem for its survival. To save the school from possible closure, series of negotiations to take over the management of the school were done between the then Bishop of Legazpi, Bishop Flaviano B. Ariola, D.D. and the Societas Verbi Divini (SVD) Congregation. Coming to an agreement, the Liceo de Albay was officially turned over by Bishop Flaviano B. Ariola, D.D. to the Provincial Superior of the SVD, Fr. Alfonse Lesage, SVD in 1961.The Society of the Divine Word appointed Fr. Joseph L. Bates, SVD, to administer the school with Msgr. Honesto A. Moraleda, a diocesan clergy, as Principal. The new school was exclusive for the education of boys and renamed Divine Word High School. 

In 1965, the Grade School Department started its operation, and got its government recognition in 1966. In 1991, the Pre-School in the Grade School Department was also opened. In its aim of improving the quality education for the young, the school submitted itself for a Preliminary Survey Visit by the Philippine Accrediting Association of Schools, Colleges and Universities (PAASCU) on February 26–27, 2007. It had a formal visit on December 2–3, 2008, and a Resurvey Visit on November 28–19, 2011 by PAASCU. The department was granted Level II accreditation status valid for 2012-2017. The Grade School has been re-accredited for another five years, valid for 2017-2022.

In 1992, the High School department offered a Science Oriented Curriculum. Fifty Six (56) freshmen students were admitted. However, due to financial problems, the program eventually was phased out in May 2001. In 1998, the High School department opened Free Secondary Distance Educational Program (FSDEP) for adult working students. And in that same year, on July 31, 1998, the High School department was granted Level 1 accreditation  by PAASCU. In response to the demand to upgrade the quality standards of education, the High School department underwent another accreditation and was granted a Level II accreditation valid for a five-year period starting 2004. On November 10–11, 2008, PAASCU visited the high School department and was granted a Level II accreditation until 2013. On the December 9–10, 2013 PAASCU visit, the department was again granted another level II accreditation for five years, valid up to 2019. With the nationwide implementation of the K-12 program in 2016, this department was now referred to as the Junior High School.

Participating in the government's program in innovation of the basic education system, the DWCL started accepting Grade 11 in Senior High School in 2016, offering Academic and Technical Vocational Tracks. In the Academic Track, the DWCL SHS department offered the following strands: Science, Technology, Engineering and Mathematics (STEM), Accountancy, Business and Management (ABM), and General Academic Strands (GAS). In the Technical and Vocational Track, the following strands were offered: Food and Beverages Services (FBS), Cookery, and Computer System Servicing (CSS). To anticipate the increase in the number of enrollees in the Senior High School, the construction of a three-storey building located at the North Campus took place.

Back in 1965, the Divine Word High School started to offer the following college undergraduate courses: Liberal Arts, Commerce, Education and Secretarial Departments, and was renamed Divine Word College of Legazpi (DWCL). In 1971, in consortium with the St. Gregory the Great Seminary in Tabaco, Albay, DWCL offered AB-Philosophy program. To be responsive to the manpower needs of the growing number of offices and entrepreneurial agencies in the Bicol Region, short-term programs for Accounting Aides and Salesmanship were opened in June 1974. As part of the expansion program in technology and business, the BS Civil Engineering program was opened two years later.

In 1987, the BSE and BEED curricula of the Education Department were reopened as a response to the increasing demand for more teachers in the public schools. With greater demands for computer literate professionals and office staff, the Commerce Department opened in 1993 the BS Computer Science (BSCS), BS in Secretarial Administration (BSSA) programs, and Computer Secretarial Course. The BSSA program was later changed to BS in Office Administration (BSOA).

Education programs were integrated in the AB-curricular programs to qualify the graduates for the Licensure Examination for Teachers (LET). The Commerce Department offered specialization in Entrepreneurship. The Accountancy Department introduced a ladderized curriculum. The CPA Review Center was also inaugurated in 1997.

During the SY 2001-2002, the departments were elevated to the college-status. Consequently, the Colleges of Accountancy, Engineering and Commerce opened the non-board programs, BS in Management and Accountancy (BSMA), BS in Information Technology (BSIT), BS in Hospitality Management (BSHM) and BS in Business Administration (BSBA) major in Marketing and Legal Management. In October 2001, the programs of the Colleges of Accountancy, Commerce, Education and Liberal Arts were awarded Level 1 Accreditation by PAASCU.

In 2003, the College of Engineering opened the BS in Electrical Engineering Program. For that, it was re-named College of Engineering and Computer Studies. All computer program offerings of the College of Commerce were transferred to COECS. It had an adjunct office called Information Technology Support Center. In November 21, 2003, the curricular programs of the Colleges of Liberal Arts, Education, Commerce and Accountancy merited Level II PAASCU Accreditation for three years.

The College of Nursing after being granted the “Permit-to-Operate” in the SY 2004-2005, admitted freshmen applicants to its BS in Nursing (BSN) program and trainees in its six-month Caregiver Training program. In the same school year, the verticalized business education program was implemented by the College of Commerce. Towards the end of 2005, the College of Commerce, Accountancy and Graduate School of Business and Management (GSBM) were merged to become the College of Business Education. A year later, the DWCL Call Center (Incubation and Training Center) was opened in a joint venture with two internationally-known entities: the Information and Communications Technology (ICT) Training and Business Process Outsourcing (BPO) Experts under the John F. Kennedy Foundation and Five9 of USA. During the same year, DWCL joined the Zonal Research Council for Region IV and V based at UP Los Baños. It also pioneered the first On-Line Enrollment System in the Bicol Region.

To immortalize the memory of the founder, the DWCL Alumni Association, in cooperation with the Office of the Mayor and City Council, succeeded in renaming Maria Clara St., Legazpi City (fronting the college campus) the Fr. Joseph Bates St. School year 2007-2008 saw the birth of the programs BS in Biology, BS Psychology and BS Mathematics at the College of Liberal Arts. In school year 2008-2009, the colleges of Arts and Sciences, Education and Business Programs were granted Level II Accreditation by the PAASCU for five (5) years.

In 2016, new nomenclature was proposed and implemented in different colleges, such as School of Arts and Science (SAS) (formerly College of Arts and Sciences), School of Education (SED) (formerly College of Education), School of Business, Management and Accountancy (SBMA) (formerly College of Business, Management and Accountancy), School of Engineering and Computer Studies (SOECS) (formerly College of Engineering and Computer Studies), School of Nursing (SoN) (formerly College of Nursing), School of Hospitality and Management (SHoM) (formerly College of Hospitality and Management).
Graduate School of Business and Management. As part of the institutional thrust of developing would-be-leaders in the business community, the Graduate School of Business and Management (GSBM) was opened in 1978, offering Master in Business Administration (MBA).In 1980, DWCL was one of the 13 Charter Member-institutions of the Bicol Conference for Higher Education (BCHE), the forerunner of the Bicol Foundation for Higher Education (BFHE).

In 1993, the GSBM enriched its MBA curricular offering with specialization in Business Education, Development Management, Enterprise Development and Financial Management. Two years later, the Master in Public Administration (MPA) and Master in Business Education (MBE) were opened. The latter was particularly designed for the faculty scholarship grantees from the College of Business Education, supported by the Fund for Assistance for Private Education (FAPE) scholarship program in the Bicol Region.

Curricular enrichments were marked in 1995. The GSBM programs were expanded with the opening of Master in Public Management (MPM) program.

Administrators
The pioneering job of the school administration was handled by Fr. Joseph L. Bates, SVD who became the director of the institution from 1961 to 1971. Fr. Donald Mulrenan, SVD became president from 1968 to 1970 when Fr. Bates went to the United States. In compliance with the move for the Filipinization of educational institutions in the Philippines, the following took over as Presidents of the Divine Word College of Legazpi in their respective terms:

Presidents
Rev. Fr. Joseph L. Bates, SVD, 1916–1970
Rev. Fr. Donald Malrenan, SVD, OIC, 1968–1969
Rev. Fr. Florante S. Camacho, SVD, 1970–1973
Rev. Fr. Valentino D. Darunday, SVD, April 1973 – 1979
Rev. Fr. Alfredo A. Reyes, SVD, June 1979 - 1985
Rev. Fr. Eleuterio S. Lacaron, SVD, October 1985 - 1989
Rev. Fr. Alfredo Reyes, SVD, June 1989 - 1990
Rev. Fr. Restituto A. Lumanlan, SVD, June 1990 - 1993
Rev. Fr. Joel Thomson Ll. Maribao, SVD, May 1993 - June 1994
Rev. Fr. Jose M. Calucag, SVD, June 1994 - 1998
Rev. Fr. Ignacio C. Joaquin, SVD, OIC 1998 - 1999
Rev. Fr. Michael O. Padua, SVD, June 1999 - 2002
Rev. Fr. Francisco T. Estepa, SVD, May 2002 – 2008
Rev. Fr. Crispin Cordero, SVD, June 2008 – 2017
Rev. Fr. Nielo M. Cantilado, SVD June 2017 – present

Notable graduates
Noel Rosal - Governor of Albay

See also
Divine Word Academy of Dagupan – Rizal Ext., Dagupan, Pangasinan
Divine Word College of Bangued – Bangued, Abra
Divine Word College of Calapan – Calapan, Oriental Mindoro
Divine Word College of Laoag – Gen. Segundo Ave., Laoag, Ilocos Norte
Divine Word College of San Jose – San Jose, Occidental Mindoro
Divine Word College of Urdaneta – Urdaneta, Pangasinan
Divine Word College of Vigan – Vigan, Ilocos Sur
Divine Word University (DWU) – Tacloban, Leyte; closed in 1995, re-opened as Liceo del Verbo Divino

References

External links
 

Universities and colleges in Bicol Region

1961 establishments in the Philippines
Catholic elementary schools in the Philippines
Catholic universities and colleges in the Philippines
Divine Word Missionaries Order
Education in Legazpi, Albay
Educational institutions established in 1961
Universities and colleges in Albay